Bihar has a total literacy rate of 69.83%. Overall Male and Female literacy rate is 70.32% and 53.57% respectively. Total Rural literacy rate is 43.9%. In rural areas of Bihar, Male and Female literacy rate is 57.1 and 29.6 respectively. Total Urban literacy rate is 71.9. In urban areas of Bihar, Male and Female literacy rate is 79.9 and 62.6 respectively. . Total number of literates in Bihar is 3,16,75,607 which consists 2,09,78,955 Male and 1,06,96,652 Female. Rohtas has highest Literacy Rate of 73.37% followed by Patna (70.68%) and Bhojpur (70.47%). Sitamarhi has lowest Literacy Rate of 51.08% followed by Purnea (51.18%) and Katihar (52.24%). A recent survey by Pratham rated the receptivity of Bihari children to their teaching as being better than those in other states. Bihar is striving to increase female literacy, now at 53.3%. At the time of independence, women's literacy in Bihar was 4.22%.

Growth in Literacy Rate

Anubhav

Literacy in Districts

Key data
Literacy
 In Absolute Numbers- 5,96,75,607
Male - 3,99,78,955
Female - 1,97,96,652
 Percentage of Total Population -69%
Male - 70.32%
Female - 53.57%
 Percentage of Urban Population -81.9%
Male - 89.9%
Female - 72.6%
 Percentage of Rural Population -53.9%
Male - 67.1%
Female - 39.6%
Highest Literacy Rate
Rohtas -  75.59%
Lowest Literacy Rate
Purnia, 52.49%

See also

 Education in Bihar
 Literacy in India
 Education in India
 Literacy

References

External links
Official website of Census of India
Official website of Government of Bihar

Education in Bihar
Literacy in India